Bellport Academy is a historic school building located at Bellport in Suffolk County, New York.  It was built in 1833 as the village's first school and remodeled in 1919.  It is located within the Bellport Village Historic District.

It was added to the National Register of Historic Places in 1980, and currently survives as a private residence.

References

School buildings on the National Register of Historic Places in New York (state)
Buildings and structures in Suffolk County, New York
National Register of Historic Places in Suffolk County, New York
Individually listed contributing properties to historic districts on the National Register in New York (state)